Calocucullia celsiae is a moth of the family Noctuidae. The species was first described by Gottlieb August Wilhelm Herrich-Schäffer in 1850. It is found from the Balkans to Turkey, northern Iraq, Armenia, Iran, Israel, Jordan and Lebanon.

Adults are on wing from January to April. There is one generation per year.

Larvae have been recorded on Hesperis desertorum in Bulgaria.

Subspecies
Calocucullia celsiae celsiae
Calocucullia celsiae levantina (Levant)

External links

Cuculliinae
Moths of Europe
Moths of Asia